The 1956 United States Senate election in Vermont took place on November 6, 1956. Incumbent Republican George Aiken ran successfully for re-election to another term in the United States Senate, defeating Democratic nominee Bernard O'Shea, editor of the Swanton Courier.

Republican primary

Results

Democratic primary

Results

General election

Candidates
George Aiken (R), incumbent U.S. Senator
Bernard O'Shea (D), publisher of the Swanton Courier

Results

See also 
 1956 United States Senate elections

References

Vermont
1956
1956 Vermont elections